Ryan Wheeler (born March 2, 1971) is an American college baseball coach and former player. He is the infield and hitting coach at Saint Joseph's University. Wheeler played college baseball at Pennsylvania State University from 1991 to 1994 for head coach Joe Hindelang. He then pursued a professional career. He previously served as the head baseball coach at Temple University from 2012 to 2014. On December 6, 2013, Temple University announced it was dropping seven intercollegiate sports, including the baseball program. The 2014 season was its last.

Playing career
Wheeler played for Penn State for four years before being drafted in the 31st round of the 1994 MLB Draft by the California Angels.  He played briefly in the minors before turning to coaching.

Coaching career
Wheeler began his coaching career at William & Mary, where he served as an assistant to head coach Jim Farr, the program's all-time winningest coach.  Upon Farr's departure, Wheeler moved to Penn for one season before accepting an assistant position at Richmond.  Eventually adding recruiting coordinator to his coaching duties, the Spiders posted 29 wins in 2011, his final season on the staff.  Prior to the 2012 season, Wheeler accepted his first head coaching position at Temple.  After Temple dropped its baseball program, he became an assistant coach and recruiting coordinator at Saint Joseph's.

Head coaching record
The following table details Wheeler's record as a head coach.

References

External links

1971 births
Living people
Temple Owls baseball coaches
Richmond Spiders baseball coaches
William & Mary Tribe baseball coaches
Penn Quakers baseball coaches
Penn State Nittany Lions baseball players
Saint Joseph's Hawks baseball coaches
Boise Hawks players